Craig Martin (born 10 November 1978) is a former Scottish professional footballer who played as a defender for Dunfermline, Albion Rovers and Stirling Albion.

Club career

Dunfermline
Martin made his professional debut for Dunfermline against Celtic in a 5-0 defeat on 19 December 1998, coming on as an 82nd minute substitute for Derek Ferguson.  He went on to make 2 more appearances for the first team, his final game coming in a 2-2 draw at home to Dundee United.

Albion Rovers
Martin had a short loan spell at Albion Rovers who were managed by John McVeigh.  He made 7 first team appearances for the Wee Rovers.

Stirling Albion
The midfielder eventually left Dunfermline to join Stirling Albion in 2001.He made 14 appearances for the Binos, scoring 1 goal which came in a 4-1 defeat to Berwick Rangers on 28 March 2001.

Managerial career
Martin had a spell as manager of Pumpherston between 2015-2022.  During this time, he guided his side to the Scottish Junior Football East Region Premier League South title in 2018-2019.

He left the post in 2022 and was replaced by Darren Pegg.

References

External links
Craig Martin on Soccerbase

1978 births
Living people
Scottish footballers
Scottish Football League players
Association football defenders
Dunfermline Athletic F.C. players
Albion Rovers F.C. players
Footballers from West Lothian
Stirling Albion F.C. players
People from Uphall
Pumpherston Juniors F.C. non-playing staff